Johanna Rolland (born 11 May 1979) is a French politician, belonging to the Socialist Party. She is the current mayor of Nantes, being the first woman to hold this position. As of April 2014, she is one of six female mayors of French cities with more than 100,000 inhabitants.

Rolland also serves as president of both the Nantes Métropole and the Metropolitan Center of Nantes - Saint-Nazaire.

References 

1979 births
Living people
Mayors of Nantes
Politicians from Pays de la Loire
Women mayors of places in France
Socialist Party (France) politicians
21st-century French women politicians
Chevaliers of the Ordre des Arts et des Lettres